The 1946 Paddington North by-election was held on 20 November 1946.  The byelection was held due to the resignation of the incumbent Labour MP, Sir Noel Mason-Macfarlane.  It was won by the Labour candidate Bill Field.

References

Paddington North by-election
Paddington North by-election
Paddington North,1946
Paddington North by-election
Paddington North,1946
Paddington